is an Italian-Japanese anime television series produced by RAI and Tokyo Movie Shinsha. Based on the character Sherlock Holmes by Arthur Conan Doyle, almost all the characters are depicted as anthropomorphic dogs. The show featured regular appearances of Jules Verne-steampunk style technology, adding a 19th-century science-fiction atmosphere to the series. It consists of 26 episodes and aired between 1984 and 1985.

Production
The series was a joint project between Japan's Tokyo Movie Shinsha and the Italian public broadcasting corporation RAI. Six episodes were directed by Hayao Miyazaki in 1981 until problems with Sir Arthur Conan Doyle's estate led to a suspension in production. By the time the issues were resolved Miyazaki had turned to other projects, and thus the remaining episodes were directed by Kyōsuke Mikuriya. The show was finally aired in 1984. The same year a film version edited together of two of the episodes directed by Miyazaki ("The Adventure of the Blue Carbuncle" and "Treasure Under the Sea") was released alongside Nausicaä of the Valley of the Wind in Japanese theaters, entitled Meitantei Hōmuzu Gekijouban. Another film, compiling "Mrs. Hudson is Taken Hostage" and "The White Cliffs of Dover" episodes was released in 1986 alongside Laputa: Castle in the Sky. Episode 12 of the series actually aired in the United States before it aired in Japan, as it was dubbed into English in 1982 (possibly commissioned by either TMS or RAI) and was broadcast on HBO in late 1983 under the title The Adventure of Sherlock Holmes.

Music
Two pieces of theme music are used for the Japanese version: The opening theme is "Sora Kara Koboreta Story" (lit. "Story Spilled From the Sky") and the ending theme is "Thames Gawa no Dance" (lit. "Dance of the Thames River"), both performed by the Japanese duo, Da Capo. The series' international versions had a single piece of theme music for the opening and ending credits. The frequent soloists are Joe Farrell on soprano, tenor and alto saxophones and flute (in his final recording) and Milt Jackson on vibes. This English theme does not exist on the UK DVD's from Manga, instead instrumentals of both the Japanese opening and ending themes were used.

Characters

; Elio Pandolfi (Italian)
 Just like his original incarnation, he has a genius intellect and is extremely knowledgeable in multiple fields. He keeps a cool and logical head despite the situation. Unlike his original incarnation, however, his only drug habit is smoking a tobacco pipe. He keeps his apartment a mess and is regularly conducting chemical experiments that lead to clouds of noxious fumes. He also seems to have feelings for Mrs. Hudson, as does the rest of the male cast. He drives a Benz Velo.

; Riccardo Garrone (Italian)
 Hound's loyal companion, he is a trained doctor who returned to England shortly before meeting Hound. He tries his best to help Hound as he can, but has difficulty at times keeping up with Hound, both mentally and physically, being a bit overweight.

; Cristina Grado (Italian)
 Hound and Watson's landlady. In most adaptations, Holmes's long-suffering landlady is shown as middle-aged or older, but in this version she is a young comely widow and a love interest of many, including Holmes, Watson, and Moriarty (mostly Holmes), and given the first name . Her late husband Jim was a pilot and Hound finds her contacts in the world of aviation useful; many of the local aviators are also former buddies of Mrs. Hudson's late husband and/or have strong romantic feelings for the caring gentle-natured Mrs. Hudson herself, and so they are always eager to assist in any way she asks. Mrs. Hudson displays a serenely-dignified and level-headed personality comparable to Hound's; she can also be quite quick and resourceful herself when need be, plus she appears to be both an experienced high-speed driver and a crack shot with a revolver. Miyazaki actually wanted to present her as the real brains of Baker Street, running rings around both Hound and his enemy Moriarty, but he was overruled.

; Mauro Bosco (Italian)
Hound's archenemy. Unlike the rarely appearing mafia donnish Moriarty in the books, this Moriarty is portrayed as working personally on his plans without any sort of support network and frequently encountering Hound and his allies, being the main antagonist in the majority of the episodes. Still an intellectual, he is a master inventor, often the one responsible for the steam punk technology seen in the show, including his personal "steam car", a tractor and tank combination rather than a car. His plans can occasionally be very complex or outlandish that rely on one questioning or linking together unusual acts, which is often how Hound figures out what Moriarty is up to. Sometimes he acts as a mercenary to other criminals who are after what he normally wouldn't steal.

; Angelo Maggi (Italian)
One of Moriarty's henchmen, created for the show. Smiley is tall, lanky, has something of a limited intellect, a thick Cockney accent and a positive attitude. In the episodes directed by Hayao Miyazaki, he is colored a pea green, while in other episodes, he's medium brown. Before working for Moriarty, he and George/Todd were members of the Bengal Pirates that appeared in the first episode, though they escaped being arrested with the rest of the crew.

; Maurizio Mattioli (Italian)
One of Moriarty's henchmen, created for the show George/Todd is small and squat, has a negative outlook on the situation, and is usually the first to criticize Moriarty or his plans. He is inconsistently called either George or Todd, sometimes within a single episode, early in the series, eventually settling on Todd, though the Japanese version shows that he's only called Todd. The two are often used for comic relief. Before they worked for Moriarty, he, along with Smiley, was a member of the Bengal Pirates that appeared in the first episode, though they escaped being arrested with the rest of the crew. Director Hayao Miyazaki modeled the appearance of the character Todd on Kazuhide Tomonaga, the animation director for the series

; Enzo Consoli (Italian)
 As Hound's go-to guy in the police force, he's also the first to call on Hound for assistance on a case. Though he is a well-meaning and passionate police officer, he's not the most attentive of people, and he also has a hotheaded and impulsive nature as well. He is usually assisted by several policemen in trying to catch and arrest Moriarty, but they always fail at trying to catch him and they seem to always end up landing themselves into comedic situations similar to that of the Keystone Cops.

Releases

DVD
In 2002, Pioneer Entertainment released the series on DVD (Region 1, NTSC format). 6 volumes or 'Case Files' were released. Each disk was double sided with the Japanese version on one side and the English dubbed version on the other side.

On 1 February 2010, Manga Entertainment released the complete series on DVD (Region 2, PAL format) in the United Kingdom as a HMV exclusive set. It has since become available in other outlets. It only contains the English dubbed version. This release also lacks the episode title cards, though the episodes are listed on the DVD case and menus.

Discotek Media released the series in a complete, unabridged DVD box set with English and Japanese versions on September 30, 2014.

Blu-ray
On 21 November 2014, Bandai Visual released the restored complete series on Blu-ray (Region A, Japanese language only) in Japan as a 4-disc set. On 30 July 2022 Discotek Media announced a Blu-ray release of the restored series for North American home video based on the Bandai HD transfer, including both the Japanese and English dubs, restored promo clips, and restored rare English dub of the pilot.

Episodes
Note: B = episode number by broadcast order, Y = episode number by YouTube order. The original air date listed is that of Japan, the first country to air the show.

See also
Sherlock Holmes pastiches

References

External links

 
 

1984 anime television series debuts
Animated television series about dogs
Aviation television series
Bandai Visual
Discotek Media
Geneon USA
Italian children's animated action television series
Italian children's animated adventure television series
Japanese children's animated action television series
Japanese children's animated adventure television series
Manga Entertainment
Nautical television series
Sherlock Holmes pastiches
Sherlock Holmes television series
TMS Entertainment
TV Asahi original programming
Steampunk